Le Québec est mort, vive le Québec! is the third studio album released by Quebec rap group Loco Locass. It was published June 12, 2012, with 14 tracks total. This disc follows their hit album Amour Oral, published 8 years earlier, in 2004.

Track listing

Singles 
Le But (Allez Montreal)

References 

2012 albums
Loco Locass albums
Audiogram (label) albums